Alois Wiesböck (born 1950), in Niederbergkirchen, is a former international motorcycle speedway rider and was winner of the Individual Speedway Long Track World Championship in 1979.

World Final appearances

Individual World Championship
 1979 -  Chorzów, Silesian Stadium - 16th - 1pt

World Team Cup
 1982 -  London, White City Stadium (with Georg Hack / Karl Maier / Egon Müller / Georg Gilgenreiner) - 3rd - 18pts (0)

World Longtrack Championship
1974 -  Scheeßel (3rd) 21pts
1975 -  Mariánské Lázně (4th) 21pts
1977 -  Aalborg (6th) 18pts
1978 -  Mühldorf (2nd) 26pts
1979 -  Mariánské Lázně (Champion) 19pts
1980 -  Scheeßel (Disq+)
1981 -  Gornja Radgona (17th) 1pt
1982 -  Esbjerg (2nd) 22pts
1983 -  Mariánské Lázně (4th) 16pts
1986 -  Pfarrkirchen (17th) 0pts
1987 -  Mühldorf  (11th) 6 pts

+ disqualified after finishing third for having an oversize engine

References

1950 births
Living people
German speedway riders
Reading Racers riders
People from Mühldorf (district)
Sportspeople from Upper Bavaria